Alpha subunits (α) refers to several protein subunits, e.g.:
G proteins
Gi alpha subunit
Gs alpha subunit
Gq alpha subunit
The pore-forming loop of ion channels